The Shearer's Covered Bridge is a covered bridge that spans the Big Chiques Creek in Lancaster County, Pennsylvania, United States. (Chiques Creek was known as Chickies Creek until 2002).

The bridge has a single span, wooden, double Burr arch trusses design. It is the only covered bridge in the county painted entirely in red, the traditional color of Lancaster County covered bridges, on both the inside and outside including both approaches.  The other all red bridge, Pool Forge Covered Bridge, is only painted on the outside.  It is one of only 3 covered bridges in the county with horizontal side boards.

The bridge's WGCB Number is 38-36-31.  Added in 1980, it is listed on the National Register of Historic Places as structure number 80003532.  It is located at  (40.17150, -76.38983).

History 
The bridge was built in 1847 by Jacob Clare.  It was rebuilt in 1855 and stayed there until it was moved in 1971 to its present location in the Manheim Memorial Park.

Dimensions 
Length:  total length
Width:  total width
Overhead clearance:

Gallery

See also
Burr arch truss
List of Lancaster County covered bridges

References 

Covered bridges in Lancaster County, Pennsylvania
Bridges completed in 1847
Bridges completed in 1855
Covered bridges on the National Register of Historic Places in Pennsylvania
1847 establishments in Pennsylvania
National Register of Historic Places in Lancaster County, Pennsylvania
Road bridges on the National Register of Historic Places in Pennsylvania
Wooden bridges in Pennsylvania
Burr Truss bridges in the United States